Kuva is a rural locality (a selo) in Beloyevskoye Rural Settlement, Kudymkarsky District, Perm Krai, Russia. The population was 1,158 as of 2010. There are 25 streets.

Geography 
Kuva is located 39 km northwest of Kudymkar (the district's administrative centre) by road. Vazh-Pashnya is the nearest rural locality.

References 

Rural localities in Kudymkarsky District